Michal Čekovský (born June 17, 1994) is a Slovak basketball player. He played college basketball for the University of Maryland.

College career
After one year with the Canarias Basketball Academy, Čekovský committed to Maryland in 2014.

Professional career
Čekovský started his career with Považská Bystrica from Trenčín Region. He won the Slovak junior championship for the 2010–11 season. In the same season he played professional basketball. He was named the most promising young player of the Slovak Basketball League for that season. On June 24, 2011, Čekovský signed a contract with the Serbian team Partizan Belgrade.

International career
Čekovský was a member of the Slovak U16 national team at the 2009 FIBA Europe Under-16 Championship Division B in Portugal.

References

External links
 Michal Čekovský | KK Partizan

1994 births
Living people
ABA League players
Basketball League of Serbia players
Centers (basketball)
KK Partizan players
Maryland Terrapins men's basketball players
Power forwards (basketball)
Slovak expatriate basketball people in Serbia
Slovak expatriate basketball people in the United States
Slovak men's basketball players
Sportspeople from Košice
MBK Handlová players